Hořice na Šumavě is a market town in Český Krumlov District in the South Bohemian Region of the Czech Republic. It has about 900 inhabitants. The town centre is well preserved and is protected by law as an urban monument zone.

Administrative parts
Villages of Mýto, Provodice, Šebanov, Skláře and Stěžerov are administrative parts of Hořice na Šumavě.

Geography
It lies in the Bohemian Forest Foothills.

History

The first written mention of Hořice na Šumavě is from 1272. From 1290, it was property of the Vyšší Brod Monastery. In 1375, it was promoted to a market town. For most of its history, it had German majority. After the World War II, the German population was expelled and the market town was repopulated by Czech settlers.

Culture
The most important event of local traditions are Hořice Passion Plays. Their origins date back to the 13th century and their modern history started in 1816. They were renewed in 1992. In 1897, the play was filmed and became one of the two earliest films about Jesus.

Sights
The main landmark of the historic centre is Church of Saint Catherine. It was built in 1483–1510 and replaced an old Romanesque church.

There are many preserved historical houses protected as cultural monuments. Along the main road and the common there is a system of seven stone fountains, which served to supply the population with drinking water. The middle one is decorated by a statue of Saint John of Nepomuk. On the square there is also a pillory from 1549.

References

External links

 

Populated places in Český Krumlov District
Market towns in the Czech Republic